Louis Nathan Blair (September 10, 1910 – June 7, 1996) was an American Major League Baseball infielder. He played for the Philadelphia Athletics during the  season. In 137 games, he posted a .279 batting average (135-for-484) with 5 home runs and 66 RBI. 

In college, Blair was named to the All-Tournament Second Team in the very first SEC Men's Basketball Tournament in 1933. He was a forward for Louisiana State University which made it to the semi-finals in the tournament. Blair played on the 1935 team that won the American Legion Bowl in Atlantic City which the team claims the National Championship for. They beat the Pitt Panthers 41–37.

References

Major League Baseball infielders
Philadelphia Athletics players
Baseball players from Mississippi
LSU Tigers basketball players
LSU Tigers baseball players
Louisiana State University alumni
1910 births
1996 deaths
People from Columbia, Mississippi
American men's basketball players
Alexandria Aces players
Binghamton Triplets players
Kansas City Blues (baseball) players
Newark Bears (IL) players
Norfolk Tars players
Oakland Oaks (baseball) players
Vicksburg Billies players
Vicksburg Hill Billies players